Stalitochara is a monotypic genus of North African woodlouse hunting spiders containing the single species, Stalitochara kabiliana. It was first described by Eugène Simon in 1913, and has only been found in Algeria.

References

Dysderidae
Monotypic Araneomorphae genera
Spiders of Africa
Taxa named by Eugène Simon